Tim Hall may refer to:

 Tim Lee Hall (1925–2008), U.S. Representative from Illinois
 Tim Hall (footballer) (born 1997), Luxembourgian association football player
 Tim Hall (American football), National Football League player